Tehrathum District, is one of 14 districts of Koshi Province of Nepal.

Demographics
At the time of the 2011 Nepal census, Tehrathum District had a population of 101,577. Of these, 49.7% spoke Nepali, 34.6% Limbu, 6.0% Tamang, 2.2% Magar, 1.9% Gurung, 1.4% Newar, 1.4% Rai, 1.0% Sherpa, 0.6% Kulung, 0.2% Maithili, 0.2% Yakkha, 0.1% Bhujel, 0.1% Majhi, 0.1% Sanskrit, 0.1% Wambule and 0.2% other languages as their first language.

In terms of ethnicity/caste, 36.0% were Limbu, 19.2% Chhetri, 13.3% Hill Brahmin, 6.6% Tamang, 4.4% Kami, 3.1% Damai/Dholi, 2.9% Gurung, 2.9% Newar, 2.4% Magar, 1.9% Rai, 1.6% Sarki, 1.3% Gharti/Bhujel, 1.1% Sherpa, 1.0% Sanyasi/Dasnami, 0.5% Kulung, 0.3% Badi, 0.3% Majhi, 0.3% Thakuri, 0.2% Yakkha, 0.1% Sunuwar and 0.3% others.

In terms of religion, 52.2% were Hindu, 33.9% Kirati, 12.5% Buddhist, 1.0% Christian, 0.1% Prakriti and 0.2% others.

In terms of literacy, 74.4% could read and write, 2.2% could only read and 23.3% could neither read nor write.

Geographics

See also
 Radio Tehrathum
 Zones of Nepal

References

External links

 
Districts of Nepal established in 1962
Districts of Koshi Province